was a Japanese computer scientist most known for his numerous world records over the past three decades for calculating digits of . He set the record 11 of the past 21 times.

Kanada was a professor in the Department of Information Science at the University of Tokyo in Tokyo, Japan until 2015.

From 2002 until 2009, Kanada held the world record calculating the number of digits in the decimal expansion of pi – exactly 1.2411 trillion digits. The calculation took more than 600 hours on 64 nodes of a HITACHI SR8000/MPP supercomputer.  Some of his competitors in recent years include Jonathan and Peter Borwein and the Chudnovsky brothers.

See also
 Chronology of computation of

References

External links
 
 
 

1949 births
2020 deaths
20th-century Japanese mathematicians
21st-century Japanese mathematicians
People from Himeji, Hyōgo
Pi-related people
Tohoku University alumni
Academic staff of the University of Tokyo